Daryl van Mieghem (born 5 December 1989) is a Dutch professional footballer who plays as a right winger for Eredivisie club FC Volendam. 

Van Mieghem started his career with lower league club AFC. After winning promotion to the Topklasse with the club, he moved to Eredivisie club Heracles Almelo, where he failed to break through. Spells with Telstar and Excelsior followed, before he returned to Heracles. He was subsequently sent on two loan spells with De Graafschap, before signing a permanent deal with the club in 2018. In total, he spent more than four years at De Graafschap before joining FC Volendam in 2021.

Club career

AFC
Van Mieghem was born in Amsterdam. He started his youth career with AFC, and went on two trials with Ajax but failed admission to their famed youth academy. Instead, he had a stint with Utrecht before returning to AFC in his final years of youth football. At age 19, he joined the first team, and in his second season he won the Hoofdklasse – Sunday A title and won promotion to the Topklasse with AFC. After making 21 appearances and six goals in his first season at that level, he attracted interest from multiple professional clubs.

Heracles Almelo
After trials with German Bundesliga club Werder Bremen and Eredivisie club Heracles Almelo, he eventually signed a two-year contract with the latter on 14 July 2011. He made his Eredivisie debut on 22 January 2012 as a substitute for Marko Vejinović in a 2–1 away loss to Groningen.

Telstar
Having mostly appeared as a substitute during his two seasons at Heracles, Van Mieghem signed a one-year contract with Eerste Divisie club Telstar on 3 July 2013. Upon signing, he stated that he "just wanted playing time" and that this was possible with Telstar. On 4 October 2013, he scored his first goal for Telstar in a 4–3 loss to Dordrecht. He grew into a starter under head coach Marcel Keizer and had a strong season with 8 goals and multiple assists.

Excelsior
Van Mieghem was signed by Excelsior on 24 April 2014, after impressing during his season with Telstar. He penned a two-year deal with the club from Kralingen. He made his debut for the club on 9 August as he was in the starting lineup in a 1–1 draw against NAC Breda. He was substituted for Lars Hutten in the 76th minute.

During his two seasons with Excelsior, Van Mieghem made 59 appearances in which he scored 8 goals and made 7 assists.

Return to Heracles
In March 2016, it was announced that Van Mieghem would return to Heracles Almelo on a two-year contract beginning 1 July 2016. On 4 August 2021, he made his debut for the club – as well as his European debut – as a second-half substitute in the 0–0 away draw against Portuguese Primeira Liga club Arouca in third qualifying round of the 2016–17 UEFA Europa League.

A few days later, he made his league debut on the first matchday in a 1–1 away draw against Roda JC Kerkrade, coming on as a substitute in the 79th minute for Brahim Darri. Mainly a substitute during his first games, Van Mieghem made his first start on 18 September in a 2–0 home loss to Ajax. He failed to impress during his second stint with Heracles, and struggled to win a permanent starting spot on the wing with Darri, Jaroslav Navrátil and Brandley Kuwas being the preferred options by manager John Stegeman. On 18 December, he scored his first goal in a 3–0 win over PEC Zwolle, after coming on as a substite for an injured Darri in the first half.

De Graafschap
Van Mieghem made 12 total appearances for Heracles, in which he scored two goals, before he was sent on loan to second-tier Eerste Divisie club De Graafschap for six months in January 2017. Upon the move, general director of Heracles, Nico-Jan Hoogma, stated: "Daryl has to play weekly at his age and that is possible at De Graafschap. Of course we will continue to follow Daryl closely, we wish him the best of luck." He made his debut for the club on 3 February 2017 as a starter in the 4–1 loss to VVV-Venlo away at De Koel. On 3 March, he scored his first goal in a 2–1 win over NAC Breda after an assist by Bryan Smeets after having come on as a second-half substitute for Anthony van den Hurk. Van Mieghem would also mostly feature as a substitute for De Graafschap, making only two starts in six months for the club. He would, however, make an impact with three goals in 14 total appearances.

On 18 July 2017, Van Mieghem's loan deal with De Graafschap was extended for another season. His second season with the club was a success, making 43 total appearances – of which 41 were as a starter – as he scored 18 goals and provided 16 assists. De Graafschap won promotion to the Eredivisie after beating Almere City in the finals of promotion play-offs by an aggregate score of 3–2. Despite his performances in the Eerste Divisie, Heracles would not extend Van Mieghem's expiring contract.

On 6 June 2018, Van Mieghem signed a permanent, one-year contract with De Graafschap after his contract with Heracles expired. In the Eredivisie, Van Mieghem was initially a starter, but lost his place in the lineup during the second half of the season to Furdjel Narsingh and upcoming youth player Delano Burgzorg. At the end of the season, the club suffered relegation to the Eredivisie, as Van Mieghem had 35 appearances in which he scored once. 

On 19 June 2019, Van Mieghem signed a one-season contract extension, keeping him at De Graafschap until 2020. This contract was extended by one more season in April 2020. He was a starter during the 2019–20 and 2020–21 seasons for De Graafschap, especially making an impact in the latter season with 38 appearances and 11 goals.

Volendam
On 5 June 2021, Van Mieghem signed a two-year contract with Volendam in the Eerste Divisie. He had become a free agent with his former club De Graafschap, despite attempts by manager Mike Snoei to sign him to another extension. He had a strong start to the season, recording five goals after five league games. Van Mieghem finished the season with 38 appearances and 11 goals, as Volendam won promotion to the Eredivisie by finishing second.

He immediately scored in his club's return to the top tier, slotting home after being assisted by Derry Murkin in a 2–2 draw against Groningen on 7 August 2022. He brought his goal tally to two goals in two games in the following league match on 14 August, scoring the opening goal in a 4–1 home loss to NEC.

Style of play
Nicknamed Mipmip in his youth by coach Cor ten Bosch in reference to the Road Runner character of the Looney Tunes, Van Mieghem is known for his pace and dribbling skills. He is left-footed, and when deployed on the right wing he uses his speed and dribbling skills to take on defenders until he finds the space to make an attempt on goal.

Career statistics

Honours
AFC
Hoofdklasse – Sunday A: 2009–10

References

External links

Profile at Voetbal International 

1989 births
Living people
Footballers from Amsterdam
Association football wingers
Dutch footballers
Amsterdamsche FC players
FC Utrecht players
Heracles Almelo players
SC Telstar players
Excelsior Rotterdam players
De Graafschap players
FC Volendam players
Eredivisie players
Eerste Divisie players
Derde Divisie players
Vierde Divisie players